is an interchange passenger railway station located in the city of Kōka, Shiga, Japan. It is operated by West Japan Railway Company (JR West), the private Ohmi Railway, and the third sector Shigaraki Kohgen Railway.

Lines

Layout

JR West, Shigaraki Kohgen Railway

JR West uses one island platform serving two tracks. The Shigaraki Line uses one side platform serving one track. The station building is elevated and above the tracks, and the station is attended.

Ohmi Railway
The Ohmi Railway uses an island platform serving two tracks on the ground.

Adjacent stations

History
Kibukawa Station opened on December 28, 1900 for both the Kusatsu Line and the Ohmi Main Line. The Shigaraki Line began operations on May 8, 1933. The Kusatsu Line and Shigaraki Line portions of the station became part of the West Japan Railway Company on April 1, 1987 due to the privatization and dissolution of the JNR and the Shigaraki Line portion was transferred to the Shigaraki Kohgen Railway on July 13, 1987.

Passenger statistics
In fiscal 2018, the JR / Shigaraki portion of the station was used by an average of 4,121 passengers daily (boarding passengers only). The Ohmi Railway portion of the station was used by 825 passengers daily in 2016.

Surrounding area
Koka City Mizuguchi Medical Care Center
Koka City Kibukawa Community Center
Kibukawa Post Office
 Japan National Route 307
 Somagawa Sports Park

See also
 List of railway stations in Japan

References

External links

  
 Ohmi Railway website 

Railway stations in Shiga Prefecture
Railway stations in Japan opened in 1900
Kōka, Shiga